Major General Syed Ghawas was a former Governor of Khyber Pakhtunkhwa, Pakistan. He was appointed by Zulfikar Ali Bhutto.

References

Pakistani generals
Governors of Khyber Pakhtunkhwa
Living people
Baloch Regiment officers
Year of birth missing (living people)
Pakistan People's Party politicians